Sauka may refer to:

Leonardas Sauka (born 1931), Lithuanian folklorist
Šarūnas Sauka (born 1958), Lithuanian postmodern painter
Michael-Fredrick Paul Sauka (1934–1990), poet and a composer from Malawi
Sauka Parish, Viesīte Municipality, Latvia
Sauka (village), a village in Sauka Parish
, Latvia
Sauka Nature Park, a protected area in Latvia

See also
 Sauk (disambiguation)